MANA can refer to:

 Mail and News Agent, a former name of Pine (email client)
Malawi News Agency
MANA, A National Latina Organization
Midwives Alliance of North America
International Center for Materials Nanoarchitectonics
MANA, a cryptocurrency used in the 3D virtual world Decentraland

See also
 Mana (disambiguation)